Mike Tadjer Barbosa (born Massy, France 10 March 1989) is a French-Portuguese rugby union player. He plays as a hooker. His father is Portuguese and his mother Syrian, but despite the fact that he was born in France, and has made all his career in that country, he decided to represent Portugal at international level.

Club career
He first played at RC Massy, where he joined the first team in 2007/08. After a season at Racing Métro 92 (2008/09), where he won the French Pro D2, he returned to RC Massy, where he would play from 2009/10 to 2014/15. He has played since then at SU Agen (2015/16-2016/17), CA Brive (2017/18), FC Grenoble (2018/19), ASM Clermont (2019/20), US Montauban (2020/21), and currently plays for USA Perpignan, since 2021/22.

International career
Tadjer has 22 caps for Portugal, with 3 tries scored, 15 points on aggregate, since his debut at the 15-7 loss to Romania, at 4 February 2012, in Bucharest, for the Six Nations B, when he was 22 years old. He has been playing for the "Lobos" since then, with some lapses of time, being a regular since 2020, and was involved in the 2023 Rugby World Cup qualifyings.

References

1989 births
French rugby union players
Portuguese rugby union players
Portugal international rugby union players
ASM Clermont Auvergne players
CA Brive players
FC Grenoble players
Racing 92 players
RC Massy players
SU Agen Lot-et-Garonne players
US Montauban players
USA Perpignan players
Rugby union hookers
Portuguese people of French descent
Living people
French people of Portuguese descent